Khorasani Turks (Khorasani Turkic: خوراسان تؤرکلری) are a Turkic ethnic group inhabiting part of North Khorasan, Razavi Khorasan and Golestan provinces of Iran, as well as in the neighboring regions of Turkmenistan up to beyond the Amu Darya River and speak Khorasani Turkic.

The Khorasani Turks are not to be confused with other Turkic groups which have arrived in Khorasan more recently, especially Iranian Azerbaijanis, who had a presence in the area, especially in Mashhad, from about the early 20th century.

Tribes
There are many clans and clans in Khorasan due to the arrival of Turks in different dates: 
Bayat lives mainly in Nishapur. 
Qarachordu lives mainly in Isfarayen. 
Imarli, Bukanli, Cuyanli, Pehlivanli, Boranli and Kilicanli lives mainly in Bojnord. Timurtash and Nardin lives in Gorgan city center. 
Godari lives in Sini. 
Afshar lives in most areas of Greater Khorasan. 
Ramiani lives in Ramian, Azadshahr and Gonbad-e Kavous counties of Golestan province. 
Hajilari lives in Minoodasht, Galikesh, Kalaleh, Gonbad-e Kavous counties of Golestan province. 
Qarai lives in Torbat-e Heydarieh. 
Several other tribes include Shamlu, Qaramanlu, and Silsüpür.

Notable Khorasani Turks 
 Haj Ghorban Soleimani
 Nader Shah
 Haji Bektash Veli

See also 
 Turkic ethnic groups in Iran
 Bayat (tribe)
 Afshar people

References

Sources 
فصلنامه تحقیقات جغرافیایی، سال سوم شماره ۲، پاییز ۱۳۷۶، دکتر محمد حسین پاپلی یزدی
The Khorasani Turks of Iran
Turks of Iran
kalafat_horasan

Ethnic groups in Iran
North Khorasan Province
Razavi Khorasan Province
Golestan Province
Turkic peoples of Asia
Oghuz Turkic ethnic groups